Erik Oluf Tuxen (4 July 1902 – 28 August 1957) was a Danish big band leader, composer and arranger, who worked for most of his life in Denmark. From 1936 until his death by cancer on 28 August 1957 he was conductor at the Danish National Symphony Orchestra of Danish Radio.

Along with Thomas Jensen and Launy Grøndahl, Tuxen pioneered performances and recordings of Carl Nielsen's music. Tuxen was also a prolific film arranger, responsible for the musical direction for many Danish films in the 1930s and 1940s. He was also a jazz bandleader.

He gave the British premiere of Nielsen's Fifth Symphony at the 1950 Edinburgh International Festival where it created a sensation. Later that year he premiered the work on disc.

References

1902 births
1957 deaths
Male composers
Danish conductors (music)
Male conductors (music)
Danish jazz musicians
20th-century Danish composers
20th-century conductors (music)
20th-century Danish male musicians
Male jazz musicians